Ablepharus ladacensis, also known as the Ladak ground skink, is a species of skink found in Tibet (China), North India, western Nepal, and northern Pakistan.

Two subspecies are recognized:

References

Further reading
 Eremchenko, Valery Konstantinovich (= Jerjomcenko). 1987 Systematic and relative links of Indo-Himalayan scincells [Sauria, Scincidae] [in Russian]. Proc. Acad. Sci. Kirghizian SSR 1987(2): 54-57

Ablepharus
Reptiles of China
Reptiles of India
Reptiles of Nepal
Reptiles of Pakistan
Fauna of Tibet
Reptiles described in 1864
Taxa named by Albert Günther